Nikolsky is a rural locality (a khutor) in Skororybskoye Rural Settlement, Podgorensky District, Voronezh Oblast, Russia. The population was 84 as of 2010.

Geography 
Nikolsky is located 4 km southwest of Podgorensky (the district's administrative centre) by road, on the Sukhaya Rossosh River. Petropavlovka is the nearest rural locality.

References 

Rural localities in Podgorensky District